The 2013 Rally America Championship is the ninth season of the Rally America Championship. This championship is the premier rally championship in the United States. The season began 25 January in Michigan, and is scheduled to return to Michigan for the Lake Superior Performance Rally on 19 October after seven events.

The championship was won by British driver David Higgins, his third consecutive championship victory. Higgins and co-driver Craig Drew took their Subaru Impreza to wins in the Rally in the 100 Acre Wood, Oregon Trail Rally and Lake Superior Performance Rally and finished in the top three placings in all seven rallies. Higgins finished 26 points ahead of Ford Fiesta driver Ken Block who won three of the other four events.

Race calendar and results
The 2013 Rally America Championship is as follows:

Championship standings
Drivers scoring at least ten points are shown. Lauchlin O'Sullivan scored 16 points, but later received a 20-point penalty. The 2013 Rally America Championship points are as follows:

References

External links
Official website

Rally America seasons
America
Rally America